Jefferson Prairie Settlement was a pioneer colony of Norwegian-Americans located in the Town of Clinton, in Rock County, Wisconsin, United States. This site and the nearby Rock Prairie settlement outside Orfordville served as centers for both Norwegian immigration and developments within the Evangelical Lutheran Church in America. The unincorporated community of Bergen is in the vicinity of Jefferson Prairie Settlement.

Background
Ole Knudsen Nattestad and Ansten Nattestad, two brothers from the valley  of Numedal in southeastern Norway, emigrated in 1837. Numedal is a traditional district located in the county of Buskerud, Norway. Together the Nattestad brothers played a key role in promoting immigration from Norway and for directing immigrants to southern Wisconsin and northern Illinois. Ole Knutson Nattestad first came to the Town of Clinton in 1838. Ansten Nattestad returned to Norway to have the letters of Ole Rynning published.  Ole Rynning (1809-1838) had been an early immigrant living in  Beaver Creek, Iroquois County, Illinois. Rynning's work was published as True Account of America (Norwegian: Sandfærdig Beretning om Amerika).

The return trip of Ansten Nattestad to Norway was instrumental in promoting interest in America. Ansten Nattestad organized more than a hundred emigrants and led them to Wisconsin, arriving in September, 1839. Some joined Ole Nattestad at Jefferson Prairie; others settled in nearby Rock Prairie. The Jefferson Prairie Lutheran Church was organized in 1844. Pioneer Lutheran Minister, Claus Lauritz Clausen, accepted a call during 1846 from Norwegian-settlers at Jefferson Prairie. He relocated from the Muskego Settlement and made Rock County the center for his activities among the settlements in southern Wisconsin and northern Illinois, remaining until 1853. Clausen based part of his efforts from Rock Prairie, which he rechristened Luther Valley.

During 1846, the Eielsen Synod, a Norwegian Lutheran church body, was founded at Jefferson Prairie by a group led by Elling Eielsen. In 1853, the Norwegian Evangelical Lutheran Church in America (the "Norwegian Synod") was organized at Luther Valley. The organizing meeting of the Augustana Synod was held at Jefferson Prairie in June 1860. Today a historic marker near Wisconsin Highway 140, four miles south  of Clinton, marks the former location of the Jefferson Prairie Settlement and highlights the role of the Nattestads in its development.

References

Related reading
Ulvestad, Martin  (1907) Nordmændene i Amerika (translated by Olaf Kringhaug as "Norwegians in America". History Book Company’s Forlag, Minneapolis, MN.).
Blegen, Theodore C.  (1931) Norwegian Migration to America, 1825-1860 (reprinted: Ayer Co Publishing, 1969)
Anderson, Rasmus Björn  (1895) First Chapter of Norwegian Immigration, 1821–1840 (reprinted: Arno Press 1979)

Additional sources
Ole Rynning's True Account of America (National Library of Oslo: translated and edited by Theodore C. Blegen) 
History of the Augustana Lutheran Church 
History of Clinton and the Surrounding Area (The Clinton Community Resources Guide. Village of Clinton, Wisconsin 1998)

External links
Jefferson Prairie Settlement Historic Marker
Jefferson Prairie Cemetery
Ole Knudsen Nattestad, Wisconsin Historic Society

Geography of Rock County, Wisconsin
Pre-statehood history of Wisconsin
Ghost towns in Wisconsin
Norwegian migration to North America
Norwegian-American culture in Wisconsin